Forty Years On may refer to:
 Forty Years On (song), 1872 song
 Forty Years On (play), 1968 play